Dario Giuliano Mario Barluzzi (6 September 1935 – 13 October 2021) was an Italian football player and manager who played as a goalkeeper. He made 85 appearances in Serie A for Milan, during the 1960s.

Honours 
A.C. Milan'''
 Coppa Italia: 1966–67
 European Cup: 1962–63

External links 

Profile at MagliaRossonera.it 
Profile at EmozioneCalcio.it 

1935 births
2021 deaths
People from Belluno
Italian footballers
Serie A players
Serie B players
Association football goalkeepers
Treviso F.B.C. 1993 players
Catania S.S.D. players
A.C. Milan players
Inter Milan players
Mantova 1911 players
S.S.D. Varese Calcio players
A.C. Belluno 1905 players
Italian football managers
S.S.D. Varese Calcio managers
Footballers from Veneto
Sportspeople from the Province of Belluno